Alima maxima is a species of shrimp in the Squillidae family, and was first described in 2002 by Shane Ahyong.

It is a benthic, tropical shrimp and found at depths from 95 - 188 m in the Eastern Central Pacific.

References

External links
Alima maxima occurrence data from GBIF

 
Crustaceans described in 2002
Taxa named by Shane T. Ahyong
Stomatopoda